Thiago Ferreira dos Santos, commonly known as Thiago Santos, is a Brazilian footballer who plays as a forward for Cypriot club Nea Salamina.

Honours
Omonia
Cypriot First Division: 2020–21

References

External links

1987 births
Living people
Brazilian footballers
Duque de Caxias Futebol Clube players
AEP Paphos FC players
Ulsan Hyundai Mipo Dockyard FC players
Othellos Athienou F.C. players
Lierse S.K. players
Israeli Premier League players
Maccabi Netanya F.C. players
Thiago Santos
Thiago Santos
Nea Salamis Famagusta FC players
AC Omonia players
Cypriot First Division players
Expatriate footballers in Israel
Brazilian expatriate footballers
Brazilian expatriate sportspeople in Israel
Rio Claro Futebol Clube players
Association football midfielders
AEK Larnaca FC players
Olympiakos Nicosia players